Markman is an English surname.

Markman may also refer to:

Law 

 Markman hearing
 Markman v. Westview Instruments, Inc.

Places 

 Markman, Eastern Cape, an industrial suburb of Port Elizabeth, South Africa on Regional Route R335